Michael McKone is a British comic book artist.

Career
McKone's first published works for the major companies included Justice League of America and Justice League International for DC Comics and The Punisher War Zone for Marvel Comics. However, it was his work on Marvel's Exiles which brought him instant attention, and led him to work on two of DC's Teen Titans and Marvel's Fantastic Four.

McKone is currently providing covers for Marvel, DC and Dynamite comics.

Awards and recognition
In July 2010, McKone was named Inkwell Awards Special Ambassador.

Bibliography

DC
 52 #52 (among other artists) (2007)
 Adventures of Superman #579 (2000)
 Detective Comics #622-624 (along with Flint Henry) (1990)
 Green Lantern, vol. 3, 80-Page Giant #2 (among other artists) (1999)
 Green Lantern, vol. 4, #26-28 (2008)
 JLA: Secret Society Of Super-Heroes, miniseries, #1-2 (2000)
 JSA All Stars, miniseries, #4 (2003)
 Justice League International (then Justice League of America, vol. 2) #25, 28, 41–42, Annual #4 (1989–90)
 Justice League of America, vol. 4, Wedding Special (2007)
 Justice League Quarterly #3, 5 (1990)
 Justice League United #0-4 (2014)
 L.E.G.I.O.N. #Ann 2-3 (1992)
 Legion Worlds, miniseries, #6 (2001)
 Mister Miracle, vol. 2, #6 (1989)
 Parallax: Emerald Night (1996)
 Superman, vol. 2, #151-153 (1999–2000)
 Superman vs. Darkseid: Apokolips Now! (2003)
 Tangent Comics: Metal Men (1997)
 Teen Titans, vol. 3, #1-6, 9–12, 16–19, 21–23, 50 (2003–07)
 Vext, miniseries, #1-6 (1999)

Image
 Spartan: Warrior Spirit, miniseries, #1-4 (1995)

Marvel
 Amazing Spider-Man #562-563, 581–582, 592–593, 606, Annual #35 (full art); #607 (along with Adriana Melo), #660 (along with Stefano Caselli) (2008–11)
 Astonishing X-Men #44-45, 47 (2012)
 Avengers Academy #1-4, 6, 8-9 (2010–11)
 Exiles #1-4, 7–10, 12–15, 18-19 (2001–03)
 Fantastic Four #527-543 (2005–07)
 Fantastic Four: Big Town, miniseries, #1-4 (2001)
 Fear Itself: Spider-Man, miniseries, #1-3 (2011)
 Heroes Reborn: Doom #1
 New Avengers #63-64 (2010)
 The Punisher: War Zone #11-14 (1993)
 Thor, vol. 4, #14 (2012)
 Uncanny X-Force #25 (2012)
 X-Men: Prime (among other artists) (1995)
 X-Men Unlimited #3 (1993)

Notes

References

External links

 Mike McKone Exclusive WIth Marvel For Two Years, Comics Bulletin

Living people
British comics artists
Marvel Comics people
DC Comics people
Year of birth missing (living people)
Place of birth missing (living people)
British expatriates in the United States